Pediasia altaica is a moth in the family Crambidae. It was described by Staudinger in 1899. It is found in Asia, where it has been recorded Sajan, Irkutsk, Amur, Altai, Tannu-Ola, Kentei and Minussinsk.

References

Crambini
Moths described in 1899
Moths of Asia